The 1985 Maine Black Bears football team was an American football team that represented the University of Maine as a member of the Yankee Conference during the 1985 NCAA Division I-AA football season. In their first season under head coach Buddy Teevens, the Black Bears compiled a 6–5 record (2–3 against conference opponents) and tied for third out of six teams in the Yankee Conference. Mark Coutts was the team captain.

Schedule

References

Maine
Maine Black Bears football seasons
Maine Black Bears football